Below is a list of comparative social surveys. Survey methodology aims to measure general patterns among a population through statistical methods. Comparative research "seeks to compare and contrast nations, cultures, societies, and institutions.", usually defined as comparing at least two different societies or nations.

References 

Survey methodology
Surveys (human research)